The Men's 25 metre standard pistol pairs event at the 2010 Commonwealth Games took place on 12 October 2010, at the CRPF Campus.

Results

External links
Report

Shooting at the 2010 Commonwealth Games